Charles Frederick Kimball (1831–1903) was a 19th-century American painter who focused on pastoral landscapes and marine art. He was also an etcher and a master cabinet maker. He was active in Portland, Maine.

Early life
A native of Maine, Charles Frederick Kimball was born in Monmouth, Maine on October 31, 1831, the youngest of thirteen children, into a family of architects and builders.

Career
He was largely self-taught. He showed local scenery paintings as early as 1853. He along with fellow landscape artist, John Bradley Hudson, Jr., shared a passion for painting en plein air, traveling around Casco Bay and Portland with their easels and brushes painting local scenery. It was these works that brought him notice. It showed his appreciation for the gentle shifts in the evening light. At this point in this career he was influenced by the Hudson River School.

He studied with Portland artist, Charles Octavius Cole and John Greenleaf Cloudman. He was a member of the Brush'uns, a group of artists who went on sketching trips together.

After gaining recognition as a gifted artist, Kimball quit painting professionally in 1863 to work as a stair builder and cabinet maker. He continued to paint as a hobby and his work found a wide regional audience. Despite his growing popularity, he did not want to commercialize his work. When he did sell a piece, it was through a small gallery or frame shop.

After quitting the "professional scene", his style evolved under the influence of the French Barbizon school.

Marriage
In 1863, he married Annie Cloudman, daughter of John Greenleaf Cloudman, his mentor. Kimball died in 1903.

Legacy
He was an active artist his whole life and a "champion of the arts" in the Portland area. He was dedicated to maintaining the local art scene. In 1882 he played a major role in the founding of the Portland Society of Arts now the Portland Museum of Art. He served as its president from 1899 until his death in 1903.

It was he and John Calvin Stevens who influenced Margaret Jane Mussey Sweat to leave the McLellan House, Portland, Maine to the Portland Art Society. The building has since become the society’s permanent home.

Works

Paintings
  1859 - Marine Hospital
  1860 - Presumpscot River Looking Toward Blackstrap
  1875 - The Lock
  1875 - Down from the Hills
  1878 - Poplars
  1879 - Twilight at Stroudwater
  1882 - Coal Sheds, Topsham and Brunswick
  1899 - Midsummer Great Diamond Island, Portland Harbor
  Portland Harbor
  Country Fence and Path
  Pine Grove
  Approaching a Cove in Casco Bay
  Woodland Lane

Etchings
  1880 - Old Houses at Stroudwater
  1889 - Coal Sheds at Topsham

Collections
Portland Museum of Art

Books
  Charles F. Kimball: Etchings, Colby College Art Museum 1965

References

External links
 

American landscape painters
American cabinetmakers
American marine artists
1831 births
1903 deaths
19th-century American people
People from Monmouth, Maine
Artists from Portland, Maine
19th-century American painters
American male painters
19th-century American male artists